Kingsland is an area in the  community of Holyhead, Anglesey, Wales.

It is also a community electoral ward for the town, electing two councillors to Holyhead Town Council. Prior to the Isle of Anglesey electoral boundary changes in 2012 Kingsland was also a ward for the Isle of Anglesey County Council, electing a county councillor. It was traditionally represented by the Labour Party. After 2012 it became part of the Ynys Gybi county ward.

According to the 2011 UK Census the population of Kingsland was 1,525.

Etymology
Then name was given to the area in 1821, when King George visited the town. He continued on to Ireland, where his visit saw the town of Dunleary renamed Kingstown in his honour. It kept the name until 1920, when it was once again given its original name in its Irish form, Dún Laoghaire. Evidence taken from 18th century letters show that the Kingsland area of Holyhead was previously called Penllechnêst.

References

Hamlets in Wales
Holyhead
Wards of Anglesey